Gun Code is a 1940 American western film directed by Sam Newfield and starring Tim McCoy, Inna Gest and Carleton Young. It was distributed by the independent company PRC which specialized in handling low-budget second features. The film's sets were designed by the art director Fred Preble.

Synopsis
The inhabitants of the town Miller Flats are intimidated by a gang running a protection racket. When the parson attempts to rally the townspeople against the gang he is killed by them. A marshal comes to town in disguise and joins forces with Betty Garrett the owner of the newspaper to bring down the racket.

Cast
 Tim McCoy as 	Marshal Tim Hammond posing as Tim Hays
 Inna Gest as 	Betty Garrett
 Lou Fulton as 	Curley Haines 
 Stephen Chase as James M. Bradley - Banker 
 Carleton Young as Henchman Slim Doyle 
 Ted Adams as Sheriff Kramer
 Robert Winkler as Jerry Garrett
 Dave O'Brien as Henchman Gale
 George Chesebro as Henchman Bart
 Jack Richardson as Mike McClure
 John Elliott as Parson A. Hammond
 Victor Adamson as Townsman 
 Bob Burns as Townsman 
 Budd Buster as 	Townsman 
 Tex Cooper as 	Townsman
 Jack Evans as Henchman 
 Herman Hack as 	Posse Rider

References

Bibliography
 Pitts, Michael R. Western Movies: A Guide to 5,105 Feature Films. McFarland, 2012.

External links
 

1940 films
1940 Western (genre) films
American Western (genre) films
Films directed by Sam Newfield
American black-and-white films
Producers Releasing Corporation films
1940s English-language films
1940s American films